Colli may refer to:

Places of Italy
Municipalities (comuni)
Colli a Volturno, in the province of Isernia
Colli del Tronto, in the province of Ascoli Piceno
Colli sul Velino, in the province of Rieti

Civil parishes (frazioni)
Colli (Monte San Giovanni Campano), in the municipality of Monte San Giovanni Campano (FR)
Colli di Fontanelle, in the municipality of Sant'Agnello (NA)
Colli San Pietro, in the municipality of Piano di Sorrento (NA)
Colli, Umbria

Other uses
Colli (surname)
Carrozzeria Colli, defunct Italian automobile manufacturer

See also
Colle (disambiguation)
Collie / Colly - disambiguation page